Physorhynchus is a genus of flowering plants belonging to the family Brassicaceae.

Its native range is Iran to Pakistan and Arabian Peninsula.

Species:

Physorhynchus brahuicus 
Physorhynchus chamaerapistrum

References

Brassicaceae
Brassicaceae genera